WBRM (1250 AM) is a radio station broadcasting a country music format. Licensed to Marion, North Carolina, United States. The station is currently owned by Todd Fowler, Brian Lilly, and Kevin Lilly, through licensee Skyline Media Holdings, LLC, and features programming from CNN Radio.

References

External links

BRM